The Contract Work Hours and Safety Standards Act (CWHSSA) is a United States federal law that covers hours and safety standards in construction contracts.

The Act applies to federal service contracts and federal and federally assisted construction contracts worth over $100,000, and requires contractors and subcontractors on covered contracts to pay laborers and mechanics employed in the performance of the contracts one and one-half times their basic rate of pay for all hours worked over 40 in a workweek. This Act also prohibits unsanitary, hazardous, or dangerous working conditions on federal and federally financed and assisted construction projects.

References
dol.gov/compliance/laws/comp-cwhssa.htm

United States federal labor legislation
United States federal legislation articles without infoboxes